Benjamin of Tudela (Binyamin al-Tutayli;‎ Tudela, Kingdom of Navarre, 1130Castile, 1173) was a medieval Jewish traveler who visited Europe, Asia, and Africa in the twelfth century. His vivid descriptions of western Asia preceded those of Marco Polo by a hundred years. With his broad education and vast knowledge of languages, Benjamin of Tudela is a major figure in medieval geography and Jewish history.

The Travels of Benjamin is an important work not only as a description of the Jewish communities, but also as a reliable source about the geography and ethnography of the Middle Ages. Some modern historians credit Benjamin with giving accurate descriptions of everyday life in the Middle Ages. Originally written in Hebrew, his itinerary was translated into Latin and later translated into most major European languages. It received much attention from Renaissance scholars in the sixteenth century.

His journeys reveal the concurrent interconnectedness and diversity of Jewish communities during this time period.

Early life 
Little is known of his early life, apart from the fact that he was from the Navarrese town of Tudela in what is now Spain. Today, a street in the aljama (former Jewish quarter) is named after him.

Journey 

There is no consensus among scholars as to Benjamin of Tudela's exact route, although most scholars believe from his itinerary that he travelled on a popular route frequented by travelers at the time. Benjamin set out on his journey from the northeast Iberian Peninsula around 1165, in what may have begun as a pilgrimage to the Holy Land. It has been suggested he may have had a commercial motive as well as a religious one. Several times the subject shows an interest in the coral trade, perhaps as a professional gem-merchant. On the other hand, he may have intended to catalog the Jewish communities en route to the Land of Israel to provide a guide where hospitality could be found for Jews traveling to the Holy Land, or for those fleeing oppression elsewhere. He stopped frequently, meeting people, visiting places, describing occupations, and giving a demographic count of Jews in each town and country that he visited. Benjamin provided his own evaluations of various cultures he encountered and, sometimes, drew parallels between customs he encountered.

His journey began in Zaragoza, farther down the valley of the Ebro to Tarragona, Barcelona, and Girona, whence he proceeded north to France, then set sail from Marseilles. After visiting Genoa, Lucca, Pisa, and Rome, he went to Greece and Constantinople, then set off across Asia. He visited Syria, Lebanon, the Land of Israel, and northern Mesopotamia (which he called Shinar) before reaching Baghdad. From there he went to Persia, then cut back across the Arabian Peninsula to Egypt and North Africa, returning to the Iberian Peninsula in 1173. In his travels, he described a significant Jewish community somewhere around modern-day Ethiopia. While it appears clear that such a community existed, scholars still struggle to decide where in Africa he actually visited—a lack of uniform spelling makes it hard to distinguish what places Benjamin and other contemporary writer travel writers are actually referencing.

His visit to the ruins outside Mosul is one of the earliest accurate descriptions of the site of ancient Nineveh. He visited 300 cities in all, including many of importance in Jewish history, such as Susa, Sura, and Pumbedita. In addition, he gathered information on many more areas that he heard about in his travels, including China and Tibet. He recorded details on cultures such as that of Al-Hashishin, the hemp smokers, introducing Western Europeans to people and places far beyond their experience.

He described his years abroad in a book, The Travels of Benjamin (מסעות בנימין, Masa'ot Binyamin, also known as ספר המסעות, Sefer ha-Masa'ot, The Book of Travels), which describes the countries he visited, with an emphasis on the Jewish communities, including their total populations and the names of notable community leaders. He also described the customs of the local population, both Jewish and non-Jewish, with an emphasis on urban life. In his accounts, Benjamin of Tudela describes Baghdad with great enthusiasm, making particular note of the virtuosity of the Caliph. He often writes of the respect and intermingle that he encounters between Judaism and Islam. He gave detailed descriptions of sites and landmarks passed along the way, as well as important buildings and marketplaces. Although Benjamin is noted for citing sources and is generally regarded by historians as trustworthy, some of his claims are faulted as relying on earlier writers. For instance, Benjamin's identification of Laish (Tel Dan) with Baniyas along with Philostorgius, Theodoret, and Samuel ben Samson is incorrect. Eusebius of Caesarea, conversely, locates Dan/Laish more accurately in the vicinity of Paneas at the fourth mile on the route to Tyre.

Commemoration
The name Benjamin of Tudela was adopted by a mid-19th-century traveler and author, known as Benjamin II.

One of the main works of Mendele Mocher Sforim, a major 19th-century Russian Jewish writer, is the 1878 Masoes Benyomen Hashlishi (מסעות בנימין השלישי) (The Wanderings of Benjamin III), which is considered something of a Jewish Don Quixote and whose title is clearly inspired by Benjamin of Tudela's book.

A street in Jerusalem's Rehavia neighborhood, Rehov Binyamin Mitudela (רחוב בנימין מטודלה), is named after him—as is a street in the former Jewish Quarter of his hometown Tudela. A high-school in his hometown is named Benjamín de Tudela after him too.

The well-known Israeli poet Nathan Alterman wrote a poem about Benjamin of Tudela, which was set to music by Naomi Shemer and was often heard on the Israeli radio.

Uri Shulevitz wrote and illustrated The Travels of Benjamin of Tudela: Through Three Continents in the Twelfth Century in 2005.

Translations of his work 
Benjamin of Tudela. The Itinerary of Benjamin of Tudela: Travels in the Middle Ages. Trans. Marcus Nathan Adler. Introductions by Michael A. Signer, Marcus Nathan Adler, and A. Asher. Published by Joseph Simon/Pangloss Press, 1993. 
The Itinerary of Benjamin of Tudela. trans. Marcus Nathan Adler. 1907: includes map of route (p. 2) and commentary. PDF format.
The Itinerary of Benjamin of Tudela: Critical Text, Translation and Commentary Nathan Marcus Adler (trans., ed., New York: Phillip Feldheim, Inc., 1907), reprint by Hebrew University – Department of History of Israel, 1960. Text document, accessed July 2020.

 Sefer Masaot Benjamin MiTudela, Trilingual edition in Basque, Spanish and Hebrew published in Pamplona, 1994 by the Government of Navarra. Xabier Kintana translated Sefer Masaot into Basque language and Jose Ramon Magdalena Nom de Deu translated into Spanish. This trilingual special edition of Benjamin MiTudela book has an introduction by the president of Navarra, Juan de la Cruz Alli Aranguren  
 Tudelalı Benjamin ve Ratisbonlu Petachia, Ortaçağ’da İki Yahudi Seyyahın Avrupa, Asya ve Afrika Gözlemleri [trans. by Nuh Arslantas, from Marmara University, Istanbul Kaknüs: İstanbul 2001  (Second ed. M.Ü. İlahiyat Fakültesi Vakfı Yayınları: İstanbul 2009

See also
Ibn Battuta
Exploration of Asia

Notes

References

Jacobs, Martin. Reorienting the East: Jewish Travelers to the Medieval Muslim World. Philadelphia: University of Pennsylvania Press, 2014. 
Jacobs, Martin. “‘A Day’s Journey’: Spatial Perceptions and Geographic Imagination in Benjamin of Tudela’s Book of Travels.” Jewish Quarterly Review 109, no. 2 (2019): 203-232.

Further reading

Jewish Virtual Library: "Benjamin of Tudela."
 Anna K. Dulska: “Abrahamic Coexistence in the Twelfth-Century Middle East? Jews among Christians and Muslims in a Travel Account by a Navarrese Jew, Benjamin of Tudela”, Journal of Beliefs & Values, DOI: 10.1080/13617672.2017.1317520, http://www.tandfonline.com/eprint/zWEMrqQ8q99rwvTpsQem/full

External links

 
 
 Video Lecture on Benjamin of Tudela by Henry Abramson of Touro College South

12th-century writers
Explorers of Asia
Holy Land travellers
Jewish explorers
Jewish historians
Explorers of Iran
Historians of Iran
Medieval Jewish travel writers
Medieval Spanish geographers
Medieval Navarrese Jews
Pilgrimage accounts
Spanish explorers
Beta Israel
12th-century Sephardi Jews
1130 births
1173 deaths
People from Tudela, Navarre
12th-century explorers
12th-century geographers
12th-century people from the Kingdom of Navarre